Kazakkulovo (Qaźaqqol) is a rural locality (a village) in Mindyaksky Selsoviet, Uchalinsky District, Bashkortostan, Russia. The population was 117 as of 2010. There are 4 streets.

Geography 
Kazakkulovo is located 71 km southwest of Uchaly (the district's administrative centre) by road. Kubagushevo is the nearest rural locality.

References 

Rural localities in Uchalinsky District